Dwarskersbos is a settlement in West Coast District Municipality in the Western Cape province of South Africa.

Fishing village some 11 km north of Laaiplek. Near here the Portuguese navigator Vasco da Gama first set foot on South African soil on 7 November 1497 when he explored the present St Helena Bay. A 6m high storm surge struck Dwarskersbos on 27 August 1969. The name is said to be derived from Afrikaans; kersbos is a type of plant, Euclea polyandra, or Sarcocaulon species. The beach stretches from Velddrif and Dwarskerbos to Elands Bay, making it the longest uninterrupted sandy beach in South Africa.

References

Populated places in the Bergrivier Local Municipality
Populated places established in 1920